Hesselager is a small town located on the island of Funen in south-central Denmark, in Svendborg Municipality. It is  located 19 km south of Nyborg, 7 km northwest of Lundeborg and 18 km northeast of Svendborg.

Close to the village stands the Damestenen (or Hesselagerstenen), the biggest glacial erratic of Denmark.

References 

Cities and towns in the Region of Southern Denmark
Svendborg Municipality